Schistura isostigma is a species of ray-finned fish in the stone loach genus Schistura. It occurs in streams with in moderate to fast currents, with sand and gravel beds in the Mekong basin in Laos, it should also occur in Cambodia and Thailand.

References 

I
Fish described in 1998